KTEL-CD, virtual channel 47 and UHF digital channel 15, is a low-power, Class A Telemundo owned-and-operated television station licensed to Albuquerque, New Mexico. Founded November 28, 1994; the station is owned by the Telemundo Station Group subsidiary of NBCUniversal. It also owns KRTN-LD (channel 39) a low-powered digital station licensed in Albuquerque, but also owns KRTN-TV in Durango, Colorado. Both stations are affiliated with the MeTV network.

KTEL-TV (UHF digital channel 25) is the full-powered satellite station based in Carlsbad, New Mexico broadcasting on digital channel 25.

Stations
KTEL-CD and  KTEL-TV both broadcast in digital.  KTEL-CD broadcasts on virtual and RF channel 15, while KTEL-TV broadcasts on channel 25.

Translator

History

KTEL-CD signed on in late 1997 on UHF channel 15 as an affiliate of Telemundo. Telemundo had previously aired in Albuquerque on K59DB (now KTVS-LD) channel 59 since about 1988. It moved to UHF channel 53 in early 1999 just before full-powered station KAPX (now KTFQ) signed on channel 14. The station  transmitted on UHF channel 53 from 1999 to 2007. KTEL-LP changed frequencies and broadcasts to channel 47 since channel 53 was part of the UHF band (Ch. 52–69) that the FCC had auctioned off from television broadcasts following the digital TV transition. Transmission on channel 53 ceased in early December 2007. The station call letters had not changed. KTEL-LP changed its call sign to KTEL-CA on March 19, 2015, and again on May 7, 2015 to the current KTEL-CD.

KTEL-TV in Carlsbad, New Mexico signed on in 2000 as a full-powered satellite for KTEL-LP. KTEL also had a full-powered satellite in Durango, Colorado from 2001 to 2011 on KTLL channel 33. That station is now KRTN-TV a satellite for KRTN-LD a MeTV affiliate and rebroadcasts KTEL on digital channel 47.1.

Santa Fe was previously covered by translator K46GY on UHF channel 46 which broadcast at 150 kW from a directional antenna from atop Sandia Crest pointed towards the area. The translator was previously K52BS  channel 52 from 1989 to 2003.

In July 2016, Ramar purchased KASA-TV from Media General for $2.5 million. On January 18, 2017; Ramar moved Telemundo to channel 2.1 which gives the network a full-powered signal in Albuquerque and makes it more competitive with Univision affiliate KLUZ. KTEL-TV will remain a satellite of KASA.

On July 30, 2021, NBCUniversal announced it was buying KASA and its repeater stations for $12.5 million. In the short term NBC announced it was entering a transitional services agreement Gray Television, which had purchased Fox affiliate KJTV-TV and other Ramar television assets in Lubbock, Texas earlier in 2021. The deal will give NBCU Telemundo 31 stations and marks the end of 23 years of Ramar's ownership of the Telemundo affiliation in the city.

Digital television

The channel line-up for KTEL-CD are currently all duplicates of programming aired on other NBC Telemundo owned stations in the market. Virtual channels 47.1 (MeTV) and 47.2 (Start TV) are broadcast from the full-powered signal of KASA-TV,

KTEL-TV
Because it was granted  an original construction permit after the FCC finalized the DTV allotment plan on April 21, 1997, KTEL-TV did not receive a companion channel for digital television stations. Instead, on or before June 12, 2009, which was the end of the digital TV conversion period for full-service stations, KTEL-TV was required to turn off its analog signal and turn on its digital signals (called a "flash-cut").

KTEL-LP continued running in analog but had a construction permit to flash-cut to digital broadcasting on channel 47. On August 11, 2014 Ramar Communications was granted construction permits to build new stations to replace KTEL-LP on UHF channel 15 and Santa Fe translator K46GY on UHF channel 16. Analog broadcasts on both stations ceased on September 3, 2014. At the end of September both stations went on the air testing their digital signals. Both stations have antenna patterns to cover both the Albuquerque and Santa Fe areas. Channel 16 has changed to KUPT-LD and now adds a new station to the Albuquerque TV market as well as giving Ramar a third station to its local cluster alongside KTEL-LD and KRTN-LD.

KRTN-LD has broadcast KTEL programming in digital from May 2009 until April 2017 displayed as channel 47.1.

References

External links 

LyngSat page for AMC-5 satellite 

MeTV affiliates
TEL-CD
Television channels and stations established in 1997
Mass media in Albuquerque, New Mexico